This is a list of notable people related to the University of Delhi. This page excludes those people whose only connection with Delhi University is that they were awarded an honorary degree.

Nine heads of state and government, and two Nobel laureates have been associated with the university.

Nobel laureates
Two Nobel laureates have been associated with Delhi University.

Activists

Arts, entertainment and television

Business

Educationists

Humanities and social sciences

Law

Supreme Court judges

Others

Literature

Military

Media

Politics and Government

Heads of state and government

Other Politicians, Royalty, Civil servants and Diplomats 

Note that Fakhruddin Ali Ahmed, the fifth President of India, graduated from St. Stephen's College, when the college was under the University of the Punjab.

Science and Engineering

Sports

Notable faculty

Notes

References

External links 
 Delhi University, DU - official website
 Office of the Dean, Alumni Affairs, DU

D